Deh Chenar-e Dalvara (also Romanized as Deh Chenār-e Dālvarā; also known as Deh Chenār and Deh Chenār-e Dālvarād) is a village in Falard Rural District, Falard District, Lordegan County, Chaharmahal and Bakhtiari Province, Iran. At the 2006 census, its population was 505, in 94 families. The village is populated by Lurs.

References 

Populated places in Lordegan County
Luri settlements in Chaharmahal and Bakhtiari Province